The 1953 Calgary Stampeders finished in 4th place in the W.I.F.U. with a 3–12–1 record and failed to make the playoffs.

Regular season

Season standings

Season schedule

Awards and records
 Jeff Nicklin Memorial Trophy – John Henry Johnson

References

Calgary Stampeders seasons
1953 Canadian football season by team